"Sing for You" is a song by South Korean–Chinese boy band Exo, released on December 10, 2015, as the lead single of their fourth extended play Sing for You. It was released in both Korean and Chinese versions by their label SM Entertainment.

Background and release 
Produced by Kenzie, "Sing for You" has been described as a "hushed, acoustic ballad". A teaser music video was released on November 8. The single, EP, and related music videos were released on December 10.

Music video 
The Korean and Chinese music videos for "Sing for You" were released on December 10, 2015. The Korean music video has over 34 million views on YouTube.

Promotion 
EXO began performing "Sing for You" on Korean music shows on December 12, 2015.

Reception 
"Sing for You" peaked at number 3 on the Gaon Digital Chart.

Charts

Weekly charts

Monthly charts

Sales

Accolades

Music program awards

References 

Exo songs
2015 songs
2015 singles
Korean-language songs
SM Entertainment singles
Songs written by Kenzie (songwriter)